6600 may refer to:
 CDC 6600, a mainframe computer from Control Data Corporation, first manufactured in 1965
 Nokia 6600, a Nokia smartphone released in 2003
 Nokia 6600 fold, a Nokia mobile phone released in 2008
 Nokia 6600 slide, a Nokia mobile phone released in 2008
 GeForce 6 series#GeForce 6600 Series, an Nvidia graphics card
 Compaq Presario 6600 Desktop PC (HP) computers
 Audiovox Audiovox ppc6600, a powerpc based pda/cellphone
 The year in the 7th millennium